Glaucobotys is a genus of moths of the family Crambidae. It contains only one species, Glaucobotys spiniformis, which is found in Kenya.

References

Endemic moths of Kenya
Spilomelinae
Crambidae genera